Punto y Coma (Period & Comma) is a studio album by Lalo Rodríguez released in 1987, following the success of his previous album, El Niño, el Hombre, el Soñador, el Loco. The album was re-released in 1992 as Como Siempre Lalo.

Track listing

References

1987 albums
Lalo Rodríguez albums